Theodore Legrand Burnett (November 14, 1829 – October 30, 1917) was an American soldier, attorney, and a prominent politician in the Confederate States of America.

Burnett was born in Spencer County, Kentucky. He served in the U.S. Army during the Mexican War. He represented Kentucky from 1861 to 1865 in the Provisional Confederate Congress, the First Confederate Congress, and the Second Confederate Congress.  Burnett Avenue in Louisville's Old Louisville neighborhood is named for him.

He is buried in Cave Hill Cemetery in Louisville, Kentucky.

References
 The Political Graveyard: Index to Politicians: Burnett at politicalgraveyard.com

1829 births
1917 deaths
Members of the Confederate House of Representatives from Kentucky
19th-century American politicians
People from Spencer County, Kentucky
American military personnel of the Mexican–American War
Burials at Cave Hill Cemetery
Presidents of the University of Louisville